Karsten Meyer may refer to:
 Karsten Meyer (sailor)
 Karsten Meyer (chemist)